Edgar Allen Christian (1 January 1879 – 29 January 1960) was a politician from Pitcairn Island. He served as Chief Magistrate in 1923, 1924 and 1932. As is commonly the case with the small population of Pitcairn, he was closely related to several other island leaders, notably brother Frederick Martin Christian, cousins Gerard Bromley Robert Christian and Charles Richard Parkin Christian, and grandfather Thursday October Christian II.

1879 births
1960 deaths
Pitcairn Islands people of Polynesian descent
Pitcairn Islands politicians
Pitcairn Islands people of English descent
Pitcairn Islands people of Manx descent